Mathis Suray (born 26 July 2001) is a Belgian footballer who plays for Dutch club FC Dordrecht.

Club career
In September 2020, he joined Dordrecht from Anderlecht.

Personal life
His father Olivier Suray played professionally for Anderlecht and Standard Liege among others.

References

External links
 Career stats & Profile - Voetbal International

2001 births
Living people
Sportspeople from Charleroi
Footballers from Hainaut (province)
Belgian footballers
Association football forwards
FC Dordrecht players
Eerste Divisie players
Belgian expatriate footballers
Expatriate footballers in England
Expatriate footballers in the Netherlands
Belgian expatriate sportspeople in the Netherlands